A Dog walked along the Piano is a 1978 Soviet comedy film directed by Vladimir Grammatikov.

Plot 
The film tells about a girl named Tanya, who lives in a village in which she does not see anything romantic. Suddenly she decided to change something and begins to make plans first about the pilot Komarov, then with Misha, who lives opposite, and her sister, meanwhile, composes various ditties.

Cast 
 Alyona Kishchik as Tanya
 Aleksandr Fomin as Mischa
 Valeri Kislenko
 Dariya Malchevskaya as Veronika
 Leonid Kuravlyov
 Vladimir Basov		
 Yuriy Katin-Yartsev
 Lyudmila Khityaeva
 Elizaveta Nikishchikhina		
 Viktor Proskurin

References

External links 
 

1978 films
1970s Russian-language films
1970s teen comedy films
1978 comedy films
Soviet teen comedy films